Bone canaliculi are microscopic canals between the lacunae of ossified bone.  The radiating processes of the osteocytes (called filopodia) project into these canals.  These cytoplasmic processes are joined together by gap junctions.  Osteocytes do not entirely fill up the canaliculi.  The remaining space is known as the periosteocytic space, which is filled with periosteocytic fluid.  This fluid contains substances too large to be transported through the gap junctions that connect the osteocytes.

In cartilage, the lacunae and hence, the chondrocytes, are isolated from each other.  Materials picked up by osteocytes adjacent to blood vessels are distributed throughout the bone matrix via the canaliculi.

Dental canaliculi
The dental canaliculi (sometimes called dentinal tubules) are the blood supply of a tooth. Odontoblast process run in the canaliculi that transverse the dentin layer and are referred as dentinal tubules. The number and size of the canaliculi decrease as the tubules move away from the pulp and toward the enamel or cementum.

See also
Lacrimal canaliculi

References 

Skeletal system
Histology